The House of Mavrogheni or Mavrogenis is the name of the Romanian noble family of Greek origin, whose members occupied many important positions in Paros, Mykonos, Crete, Ikaria, Constantinople, Principality of Samos, as well as in Wallachia, Moldavia and in the Kingdom of Romania.

History 
After the conquest of Karystos by the Turks, the Mavrogenides, fearing the revenge of the Turks due to their kinship with Morosini family, fled to the Cyclades. In 1715 two brothers, Petros and Stefanos, bought large lands in Paros and rebuilt the island's church. Stefanos left for Constantinople and served as Dragoman of the Fleet, while Petros remained in Paros. The family then expanded to Mykonos, of which they owned 3/4 of the land. The highlight of the family fortune culminated with the appointment of Nikolaos Mavrogenis as the ruling Prince of Wallachia, since he had previously served as Dragoman of the fleet. The prominent path of the family was continued by other members, such as Stefanos Mavrogenis, nephew of Nikolaos, who served as Grand Logothete of the Patriarchate. But even after the revolution in 1821, members of the family distinguished themselves in the social life of the Ottoman and Greek states. Such were Alexandros Mavrogenis the ambassador of Turkey (Stephanos' nephew), Spyridon's son, the sultan's arch-physician, etc. In the Greek revolution, the Mavrogenis family was glorified once again thanks to the contribution of Manto Mavrogenous (Stephanos' niece), who donated all her wealth for the struggle. In free Greece, many members of the family were lieutenant generals, mayors, parliamentarians, etc. A branch of the family also existed in Crete, which in fact became particularly famous with the revolution of Mavrogenis in 1858.

Notable members 
Nicolae Mavrogheni (1735–1790), Prince of Wallachia 
Petre Mavrogheni (1819–1887), Romanian politician

References 

Phanariotes
Romanian noble families